In medicine, paresis is a condition typified by a weakness of voluntary movement, or by partial loss of voluntary movement or by impaired movement. When used without qualifiers, it usually refers to the limbs, but it can also be used to describe the muscles of the eyes (ophthalmoparesis), the stomach (gastroparesis), and also the vocal cords (Vocal cord paresis).  Neurologists use the term paresis to describe weakness, and plegia to describe paralysis in which all voluntary movement is lost. The term paresis comes from the  'letting go' from παρίημι 'to let go, to let fall'.

Types

Limbs
 Monoparesis – One leg or one arm
 Paraparesis – Both legs
 Hemiparesis – The loss of function to only one side of the body
 Triparesis Three limbs. This can either mean both legs and one arm, both arms and a leg, or a combination of one arm, one leg, and face
 Double Hemiparesis  all four limbs are involved, but one side of the body is more affected than the other
 Tetraparesis – All four limbs
 Quadriparesis All four limbs, equally affected
 These terms frequently refer to the impairment of motion in multiple sclerosis and cerebral palsy

Other
 Gastroparesis – impaired stomach emptying
 A form of ophthalmoplegia
 Spastic paresis – exaggerated tendon reflexes and muscle hypertonia
 In the past, the term was most commonly used to refer to "general paresis", which was a symptom of untreated syphilis. However, due to improvements in treatment of syphilis, it is now rarely used in this context.

See also

 Asthenia
 Ataxia
 Atony
 Catatonia
 Fatigue (physical)
 Facial nerve paralysis
 Hypotonia
 Malaise
 Muscle weakness
 Palsy

References

External links
 Overview
 Hind Limb Paresis and Paralysis in Rabbits

Symptoms and signs
Medical terminology